North Middlesex Regional School District is an operating school district, located in the north/central section of Massachusetts on the New Hampshire/Massachusetts border, and serving the towns of Ashby, Pepperell and Townsend.

Schools

High schools
North Middlesex Regional High School (Townsend)

Middle schools
Hawthorne Brook Middle School (Townsend, and Ashby)
Nissitissit Middle School (Pepperell)

Elementary schools
Ashby Elementary School (Ashby) 
Spaulding Memorial School (Townsend)
Varnum Brook Elementary School (Pepperell)

Special education/preschools
 Squannacook Early Childhood Center

References

External links

School districts in Massachusetts